Prince Carl of Sweden and Norway, Duke of Västergötland (27 February 1861 – 24 October 1951) was a Swedish prince. Through his daughters, for whom he arranged excellent dynastic marriages, he is an ancestor of several members of European royal houses today, including the reigning monarchs King Harald V of Norway, King Philippe of Belgium, and Grand Duke Henri of Luxembourg.

Early life

Carl was the third son and child of King Oscar II of Sweden-Norway by his wife, Sophia of Nassau. He was known as "the Blue Prince" (Blå Prinsen) because he often wore the blue-coloured uniform of the Life Regiment, to which he belonged in a ceremonial manner.

Marriage and children

In May 1897, Prince Carl was engaged to Princess Ingeborg of Denmark, the second daughter of King Frederick VIII of Denmark. Ingeborg's mother, Louise of Sweden, was a first cousin of Prince Carl. Nevertheless, in 1947, on the occasion of their 50th wedding anniversary, Carl admitted that their marriage had been completely arranged by their respective fathers, and Ingeborg herself added : "I married a complete stranger!".

The couple were married on 27 August 1897 at Christiansborg Palace in Copenhagen and spent their wedding trip (honeymoon) in Germany. The couple had four children:

 Margaretha (1899–1977), who married Prince Axel of Denmark
 Märtha (1901–1954), wife of Crown Prince Olav of Norway and mother of Harald V of Norway
 Astrid (1905–1935), wife of Leopold III of Belgium and mother of kings Baudouin and Albert II of Belgium, as also of Grand Duchess Joséphine Charlotte of Luxembourg.
 Carl, Duke of Östergötland, known as Carl Jr., later Prince Bernadotte (1911–2003).

All of Carl's children grew up to be healthy adults. While all three daughters made dynastic marriages that were encouraged by their parents, and became the matriarchs of their own successful families, the couple's only son gave up his (highly improbable) chance of succeeding to the throne to marry a noblewoman.

Candidate for the Norwegian throne
In 1905, during the political struggle in which Norway obtained its independence from Sweden, Prince Carl was seriously considered as a candidate for the Norwegian crown. It was thought that electing a Swedish prince as king was a less radical way for Norway to secede from the union, and hence a more peaceful approach. Carl was chosen because his eldest brother would inherit the Swedish throne, and his second brother had renounced his royal status to make an unsuitable marriage. However, Carl's father King Oscar II of Sweden did not approve of the proposal, as he saw the whole "riot" which precipitated the Norwegian crisis as a conspiracy and a betrayal against his rights as King of Norway, and he did not want any of his sons to be involved with people who he considered his enemies. Therefore, Prince Carl never became King of Norway. Instead, another Prince Carl – Prince Carl of Denmark – was elected after some diplomatic turbulence, taking the name Haakon VII. As history turned out however, the Duke of Västergötland's daughter, Princess Märtha, married Haakon VII's son, who later became King Olav V. Hence, the present King, Harald V of Norway, is a grandchild of the duke.

Legacy
Prince Carl has the distinction of being a grandfather of three reigning European monarchs: King Harald V of Norway (son of his daughter, Princess Märtha), the late King Baudouin of the Belgians and his brother, King Albert II of the Belgians (sons of his daughter, Princess Astrid). He is also a great-grandfather of King Philippe of the Belgians and Grand Duke Henri of Luxembourg.

Honours
National honours
 Knight and Commander of the Seraphim, 27 February 1861
 Knight of the Order of Charles XIII, 27 February 1861
 Commander Grand Cross of the Sword, 27 February 1861
 Commander Grand Cross of the Polar Star, 27 February 1861
 Commander Grand Cross of the Order of Vasa, 28 April 1892
 Honorary Member of the Johanniter Order

Foreign honours

Arms

Ancestry

References

Citations

Bibliography

 Bomann-Larsen, Tor: Folket – Haakon & Maud II (2004; in Norwegian)

External links
 

Carl, Duke of Vastergotland, Prince
Carl, Duke of Vastergotland, Prince
Carl 1861
Swedish people of French descent
Swedish people of German descent
Carl, Duke of Vastergotland, Prince
Carl, Duke of Vastergotland, Prince
People from Stockholm
Swedish Lutherans
Dukes of Västergötland
Sons of kings
Burials at Kungliga begravningsplatsen

Commanders Grand Cross of the Order of the Polar Star
Commanders Grand Cross of the Order of the Sword
Knights of the Order of Charles XIII
Grand Crosses of the Order of Vasa
Knights of the Order of the Norwegian Lion
Recipients of the King Haakon VII Freedom Cross
Grand Crosses of the Order of Saint Stephen of Hungary
Recipients of the Cross of Honour of the Order of the Dannebrog
Grand Croix of the Légion d'honneur
Grand Crosses of the Order of Saint-Charles
Recipients of the Order of the Netherlands Lion
Grand Crosses of the Order of the Star of Romania
Recipients of the Order of the White Eagle (Russia)
Recipients of the Order of St. Anna, 1st class
Honorary Knights Grand Cross of the Royal Victorian Order